The Montgomery County School District is a public school district in Montgomery County, Georgia, United States, based in Mount Vernon. It serves the communities of Ailey, Alston, Higgston, Mount Vernon, Tarrytown, Uvalda, and Vidalia.

Schools
The Montgomery County School District has one elementary school, one middle school, and one high school.

Elementary school
Montgomery County Elementary School

Middle school
Montgomery County Middle School

High school
Montgomery County High School.  Their mascot is the Eagles. Sports available include baseball, football, wrestling, and basketball.

The school has received national attention in the New York Times for unofficially sponsoring separate, segregated proms for white and black students.  Though many students are comfortable with the concept of an integrated prom, many parents have repeatedly blocked measures to sponsor such an event.

References

External links

School districts in Georgia (U.S. state)
Education in Montgomery County, Georgia